Ashi-Hishigi also called an Achilles lock or simply an ankle lock, is a technique described in both The Canon Of Judo by Kyuzo Mifune and Brazilian Jiu-Jitsu, Theory and Technique by Renzo Gracie and Royler Gracie as well as demonstrated in the video, The Essence Of Judo. It is classified as a joint lock (Kansetsu-waza), and is not a recognized technique of the Kodokan. However, it is a commonly used technique in both Brazilian Jiu-Jitsu tournaments and Mixed martial arts competition.

Technique Description 
Executing this lock involves pressing the achilles tendon into the back of the ankle or lower leg. It is typically performed by wedging a forearm, especially a bony part of it, into the Achilles tendon. Simultaneously leveraging the foot and the leg over the forearm, which serves as a fulcrum. This causes severe pressure on the Achilles tendon, often resulting in an ankle lock, since the ankle is being used as a point of leverage. Similarly, some ankle locks also cause a compression lock on the Achilles tendon, and hence the term "Achilles lock" is often also used to describe such ankle locks.

Included Systems 
Lists:
The Canon Of Judo
Judo technique

Similar Techniques, Variants, and Aliases 
Aliases:
Achilles lock
Ankle lock or Straight ankle lock

References 

Martial art techniques
Judo technique
Grappling hold

ja:アキレス腱固め